Sanchi Assembly constituency is one of the 230 Vidhan Sabha (Legislative Assembly) constituencies of Madhya Pradesh state in central India. It is a segment of Vidisha Lok Sabha constituency. Sanchi is known for its Buddhist monuments, called Sanchi Stupa-s.

The assembly seat lies in Raisen District.

Members of Vidhan Sabha

Election results

1962 Vidhan Sabha Elections
 Gulab Chand (SOC) : 7,979 votes  
 Vijai Singh (INC) : 7,400

2013 Vidhan Sabha Elections
 Dr Gourishankar Shejwar (BJP) : 85,599 votes    
 Dr Prabhuram Choudhary  (INC) : 64,663

See also
 Sanchi

References

Assembly constituencies of Madhya Pradesh